James Mark Sullivan (January 6, 1873 – August 15, 1935) was a lawyer and the Envoy Extraordinary and Minister Plenipotentiary to Santo Domingo under Woodrow Wilson. He was arrested in Dublin in 1916 for aiding the Irish rebellion.

Biography
He was born in Kerry, Ireland on January 6, 1873. He emigrated to the United States with his family when he was a boy and he became a lawyer and prize fight promoter there. He married Ellen O'Mara in 1910.

In March 1916, along with his wife, he and Henry M. Fitzgibbon founded the Film Company of Ireland. In 1919 his son caught typhiod and Ellen caught the disease and died. The film company ended the following year once the three films in production had been completed.

He served during turbulent times in the history of the Dominican Republic and was recalled to Washington at least once because "his services have not been wholly satisfactory". He was appointed August 12, 1913 and left the post on June 20, 1915.

Sullivan was mistakenly reported as dead in August 1920 by several American newspapers, including the Hartford Courant, which published his obituary on the front page of its August 24 issue and eulogized him as "the diplomat of the tropics" and the man "who originated shirtsleeve statesmanship" for his work as the U.S. minister to the Dominican Republic. Three days later, the Courant printed a correction and informed people that "The report this week originated in the 'New Haven Journal-Courier.'"   Fifteen years to the month later, the Courant gave the report of his actual death and eulogized him as being "recalled throughout Connecticut tonight as one of the most colorful figures ever a part of the state's history."

He was a friend of Michael Collins. He died in St. Petersburg, Florida on August 15, 1935.

References

1873 births
1935 deaths
Ambassadors of the United States to the Dominican Republic
People of the Easter Rising
Irish diplomats